Costas Valsamis (1908–2003) was a Greek sculptor.  He was born on the island of Symi, Dodecanese, then in the Ottoman Empire and died in Athens. His work was part of the sculpture event in the art competition at the 1948 Summer Olympics.

Biography 

In 1932 he entered the Athens School of Fine Arts where he studied under Costas Dimitriadis.  Completing his studies in 1937, he worked as a sculptor in Athens until 1945, then was granted a scholarship by the French government.

He entered the Ecole des Beaux-Arts in Paris in the atelier of Marcel Gimond then, at the Académie de la Grande Chaumiere, he was a student of Ossip Zadkine.

Awards

In 1979, he was nominated as a Knight in the Orders of Arts and Letters by the Ministry of Culture and Communication of the French Government.

In 1987, he became a member of the corresponding French Academy of Fine Arts.

Personal life

Valsamis was married to Zoe Valsamis, a painter and graduate of the Ecole des Beaux-Arts in Paris.

Creations 
Heroic Woman, plaster, Middelheimmuseum.
The Purity, bronze, Parc Montsouris.
The Mother in the occupation, bronze, the first cemetery of Athens.
El Greco, bronze bust, Academias street, the square of the cultural center of Athens.
The Little Fisherman, bronze, Symi.
The Dove of Peace, Symi.
C.P. Cavafy, bronze bust, near the Pedion tou Areos, Athens

Bibliography 
Benezit, Dictionary of Artists.
Dizionario Universale delle Belle Arti Comanducci.

References

External links 
Some Works of the Artist

Greek sculptors
1908 births
2003 deaths
20th-century sculptors
20th-century Greek sculptors
Olympic competitors in art competitions
People from Symi